Book burnings in Chile were done by the military junta led by dictator General Augusto Pinochet following the 1973 Chilean coup d'état. The military dictatorship burned the books they considered subversive, including leftist literature as well as other books that did not fit the junta's ideology, being part of a campaign to "extirpate the Marxist cancer."

Following the coup, the military began raids to find potential opponents of the new regime, who were then held and some of them executed at the Estadio Nacional and other places. In addition to this, during the raids the military gathered and burned large numbers of books: not just Marxist literature, but also general sociological literature, newspapers and magazines. In addition to this, such books were withdrawn from the shelves of bookstores and libraries. In some instances, even books on Cubism were burned because soldiers thought it had to do with the Cuban Revolution.

The book burning attracted international protests: the American Library Association condemned them, arguing that it is "a despicable form of suppression" which "violates the fundamental rights of the people of Chile."

Sporadic book burning occurred throughout the junta's regime which lasted until 1990. On November 28, 1986, the customs authorities seized almost 15,000 copies of Gabriel García Márquez's book Clandestine in Chile, which were later burned by military authorities in Valparaíso. Together with them, copies of a book of essays by Venezuelan ex-guerrilla and presidential candidate Teodoro Petkoff were also burned.

See also
 Book burning
 Nazi book burnings

Notes

References
 Haig A. Bosmajian, Burning Books, McFarland, 2006, 

Book burnings
Censorship in Chile
Military dictatorship of Chile (1973–1990)